The Karpeles Manuscript Library Museums are a private collection of more than a million manuscripts and documents in the United States, the largest such collection in the world. Items are rotated between museums quarterly, and each of the museums presents a daily general exhibit and one or more special scheduled exhibits throughout the year. In addition, Karpeles is aggressively expanding the content of its website. All of the Karpeles Manuscript Library services are free. The museums are located in small and midsize cities, although the Karpeleses put on an exhibit on Central Park West in New York City in 1991. , there were seventeen museums in fifteen cities.

David Karpeles died on January, 19, 2022.

Libraries

Buffalo, New York
In Buffalo, the Karpeles Museum consists of two separate buildings: Porter Hall at 453 Porter Avenue at Jersey Street and Plymouth Avenue; and North Hall at 220 North Street at Elmwood Avenue. Porter Hall was originally the Plymouth Methodist Church, while the North Hall was originally First Church of Christ, Scientist, built in 1911. The architecture of the building was designed to mimic a medieval church both inside and out, the structure creates a dominating and fascinating location for the Karpeles Manuscript Library Museum. The rough textured building contrasts with its vibrant red roof tiles and 25 foot picture windows. The cavernous interior is characterized by many bays, wings and a massive room divider. Furthermore, its atypical asymmetric design complements the triangular corner lot.

Charleston, South Carolina
Karpeles Manuscript Museum in Charleston is housed in the former St. James Chapel, a Methodist church built in 1856. The building is in the Greek Revival style following the Corinthian order and was inspired by the Temple of Jupiter in Rome. During the Civil War, Confederates used the building as a hospital and stored medical supplies there. Hurricane Hugo tore off the roof of the building and destroyed its interior on September 21, 1989. Following renovation, the building reopened on November 11, 1990.

Duluth, Minnesota
The Duluth Museum at 902 East 1st Street was originally First Church of Christ, Scientist, built in 1912; the original organ has been retained in the rotunda. The structure is a beautiful building with a large main floor exhibit hall. As the ceiling is high, the acoustics are excellent and the building is very suitable for musical concerts and other programs.  The Karpeles Manuscript Library Museum in Duluth provides a School Outreach Program with reproductions of original documents in special display cases located in area schools, colleges and libraries.  At the present time the museum supports seventeen elementary, junior and high schools in Duluth, the Twin Cities area and also now in Wisconsin and Canada.  The documents and manuscripts are specially chosen to supplement school curriculum and matters of topical interest and are also on display at two local colleges and three public libraries.

Fort Wayne, Indiana
The Karpeles Museum in Fort Wayne occupies two buildings. Fairfield Hall at 2410 Fairfield Avenue is a former Church of Christ Scientist building and houses a rotating collection of historical documents, old and ancient ship models, and stone hieroglyphic inscriptions from the time of Moses. Piqua Hall is housed in a domed church at 3039 Piqua Avenue< built in 1917 as the First Church of God. It houses a rotating collection of historical maps.

The Fort Wayne location provides an educational outreach program in the form of mini-museum displays that are set up in local schools and maintained by museum staff.

Jacksonville, Florida

The Jacksonville Karpeles Manuscript Library Museum is located in the former First Church of Christ, Scientist building, a 1921 neoclassical structure in the Springfield neighborhood. There is also an antique book library, with volumes dating from the late 19th century, and a children's center.

Newburgh, New York
The Karpeles Museum in Newburgh, New York, is located at 94 Broadway.  It houses the Dona McPhillips Historical Painting Series, which includes many portraits of famous Americans grouped together as "Founding Fathers", "Civil War Union", "Civil War Confederates", "Indian Heroes", "More Indian Heroes", "Pathfinders", "Texas", "Blacks", "Pioneers" and "Women".

Rock Island, Illinois

The museum building in Rock Island was originally the First Church of Christ, Scientist, built in 1896 in the Broadway Historic District. The building was designed by architect William C. Jones of Chicago in the Palladian style, it was built between 1914-1915. Its exterior walls are of brick covered by Bedford limestone. Its superimposed front portico is supported by six 2 story columns with egg-and-dart capitals. The dome actually consists of 2 domes: an outer dome and an inner dome which are separated by a space for lighting fixtures and maintenance. The inner dome consists of some 8,000 colored fish scale glass panes on a wooden support structure. The building was added to the National Register of Historic Places on August 14, 1998.

St. Louis, Missouri
The St. Louis branch of the Karpeles Manuscript Library opened on August 1, 2015. St. Louis is the largest metropolitan area to host a Karpeles Manuscript Library Museum. The museum is located at 3524 Russell Boulevard, near Grand Boulevard and across the street from Compton Hill Reservoir Park. The structure was built as the Third Christian Science Church and opened in 1911 (it had been occupied in later decades by The New Paradise Missionary Baptist Church). The St. Louis Media History Foundation's Archives Exhibit Room is also housed in the building.The  collection was featured on the PBS program, "Living St.Louis."

On March 26, 2019, a three alarm fire broke out at the museum causing considerable damage, mostly to the roof and the back of the building.  About 80 firefighters were dispatched to the scene to fight the fire and haul out historic pieces such as old wooden ships and statues. St. Louis Building Commissioner Frank Oswald said the building was structurally sound and could be repaired, as it had a steel, not wooden, skeleton. , the roof has not yet been repaired.

Santa Barbara, California

The Santa Barbara Karpeles Museum, the first to be opened, is at 21 West Anapamu Street. Since its opening in 1986, the Karpeles in Santa Barbara has displayed thousands of historic documents and presented many full exhibits. Among those items on permanent display in the museum is an original Stone copy of the Declaration of Independence, a replica of the globe used by Columbus (sans the Western Hemisphere), handwritten scores by a dozen leading composers, and the computer guidance system used on the first Apollo lander flight to the moon. The Karpeles in Santa Barbara has played an important role in the educational and cultural life of the area.

Shreveport, Louisiana
The Karpeles Manuscript Library in Shreveport at 3201 Centenary Avenue was originally First Church of Christ, Scientist.

Tacoma, Washington
The Karpeles Manuscript Museum in Tacoma, Washington, which opened in 1991, is located at 407 South G Street in a former American Legion post built in 1931, across the street from the Wright Park Arboretum.

Gloversville, New York
The Karpeles Museum in Gloversville, New York opened in 2020 at 66 Kingsboro Avenue.  Housed in a former Christian Science church built in 1923, it is the 15th location in the chain.

Examples of documents from the collection

Music
Ludwig van Beethoven's Emperor Concerto
Handel's Messiah, copied in the hand of Beethoven
Wolfgang Amadeus Mozart's The Marriage of Figaro
Richard Wagner's "Wedding March"

Science
Darwin's Theory of Evolution
Descartes' Treatise as the Father of Philosophy
Einstein's Theory of Relativity
Galileo's announcement of the completion of his publication Dialogue on Two New Sciences
Some of Donald A. Hall's initial sketches and calculations for the design of the Spirit of St. Louis
Excerpts from John Locke's Essay Concerning Human Understanding
A note written by Charles Lindbergh
A portion of Newton's studies on religion
Astronomer Michael Molnar's Mystery of the Star of Bethlehem

Religion
The first printing of the Ten Commandments from The Gutenberg Bible (ca. 1455)
John Calvin's Ioannis Calvinus
Luther and the Birth of the Protestant Movement
Pope Lucius III's Proclamation of the Holy Crusade

Literature
Roget's Thesaurus
The stage version of Mark Twain's Tom Sawyer
Webster's Dictionary

Political history
Bill of Rights
Confederate Constitution
The Declaration of Allegiance to the Government of the United States by the Native American Indians
Lincoln's Emancipation Proclamation
John Hancock's Cover Letter to the Declaration of Independence
Olive Branch Petition
George Washington's Thanksgiving Proclamation

Exploration
Christopher Columbus's Lettera Rarissima
Sir Ernest Shackleton's hand-drawn map of Antarctica
Amelia Earhart's Certificate of Landing for her solo flight across the Atlantic

Artwork
Pat Burger Homeless Exhibit Collection
Dona McPhillips Historical Exhibit Collection
Norman Rockwell pencil drafts Exhibit Collection
The Brock Brothers Illustration Archive
Classic Book Illustrations

Programs

The Library provides special educational programs and lectures for schools at all levels. The most popular of these are the Cultural Literacy Program and the School Outreach Program. In addition, Mini-Museums are maintained in many universities, secondary schools and grade schools throughout the country. These are free programs and grade schools, secondary schools, colleges or universities may participate.

References

External links

1983 establishments in the United States
Biographical museums in the United States
Collections of museums in the United States
Libraries established in the 1980s
Libraries in California
Libraries in Florida
Libraries in Indiana
Libraries in Louisiana
Libraries in Minnesota
Libraries in New York (state)
Libraries in South Carolina
Libraries in Washington (state)
Literary museums in the United States
Museums established in 1983
Museums in Charleston, South Carolina
Museums in Duluth, Minnesota
Museums in Fort Wayne, Indiana
Museums in Orange County, New York
Museums in Rock Island County, Illinois
Museums in Santa Barbara, California
Museums in Shreveport, Louisiana
Museums in Tacoma, Washington